Mooney Mooney is a suburb of the Central Coast region of New South Wales, Australia, at the end of a peninsula extending southwards into the Hawkesbury River estuary situated  north of Sydney. It is where the Pacific Motorway and Pacific Highway cross from the Central Coast into Sydney's metropolitan area at Brooklyn in the Hornsby Shire.

History
Mooney Mooney is significant 'for its association with the early settlement of coastal NSW', according to a plaque at Deerubbun Reserve. In 1844, an early-colonial settler, George Peat, commenced a ferry service across the Hawkesbury River, from Mooney Mooney Point to Kangaroo Point on the southern bank. By 1930 this service was replaced by two diesel-powered vehicular ferries which became obsolete on completion of the Peats Ferry Road Bridge in 1945. Remnant timber piles of the former ferry docks, preserved in situ for posterity, can be seen on the foreshore of Mooney Mooney Point.

The locality
Mooney Mooney is part of the Central Coast Council local government area. It includes Peat Island and Spectacle Island. It formerly included Cheero Point to the north, which was separately gazetted on 21 March 2003.

Its topography is characterised by a rocky foreshore onto the Hawkesbury River and a hilly landscape with slopes ranging from moderate to very steep. Land use is dominated by the north–south transport corridors, comprising the M1 Pacific Motorway and the Pacific Highway, and two adjoining residential areas east of the highway. Oyster farms and related depuration depots are in the suburb's south. The locality is serviced by sealed roads, electricity, telephone, and a reticulated water supply.

The  Deerubbun Reserve adjoining the motorway at the suburb's southwest has been developed for public access to the Hawkesbury River. The reserve's public facilities include wharf, boat ramps, car and trailer parking area, fish-cleaning table, advisory signs (boating, fishing, personal water craft and navigation), picnic tables and amenities.

Linked by a causeway, the former Peat Island hospital, to the west, is now operated by the Department of Community Services. The  Spectacle Island, to the east, is an offshore nature reserve managed by the National Parks and Wildlife Service.

See also 
 List of reduplicated Australian place names

References 

Suburbs of the Central Coast (New South Wales)
Hawkesbury River